is a former Japanese international table tennis player.

He won five World Table Tennis Championships medals in five consecutive championships.

See also
 List of table tennis players
 List of World Table Tennis Championships medalists

References

Japanese male table tennis players
Asian Games medalists in table tennis
Table tennis players at the 1978 Asian Games
Medalists at the 1978 Asian Games
Asian Games silver medalists for Japan
Asian Games bronze medalists for Japan
World Table Tennis Championships medalists